Marko Letonja (born 12 August 1961) is a Slovenian conductor.

Biography
Letonja studied piano and conducting at the Academy of Music in Ljubljana, where his conducting teachers included Anton Nanut.  He continued his conducting studies at the Vienna University of Music and Performing Arts, with such teachers as Otmar Suitner.  He granted from the Vienna University of Music and Performing Arts in 1989.

From 1996 to 2002, Letonja was chief conductor of the Slovenian Philharmonic Orchestra, and from 2003 to 2006, held the same position with Sinfonieorchester Basel.  From 2011 through the end of 2018, Letonja was chief conductor and artistic director of the Tasmanian Symphony Orchestra (TSO).  He now has the title of conductor laureate of the TSO.

In 2012, Letonja became music director of the Orchestre Philharmonique de Strasbourg, and held the post through 2021.  In 2018, he became chief conductor of the Bremer Philharmoniker.

Awards and nominations

ARIA Music Awards
The ARIA Music Awards is an annual awards ceremony that recognises excellence, innovation, and achievement across all genres of Australian music. They commenced in 1987. 

! 
|-
| 2014
| Mozart Arias (with (Emma Matthews & Tasmanian Symphony Orchestra)
| Best Classical Album
| 
| 
|-

References

External links
 IMG Artists agency page on Marko Letonja
 All Music page on Marko Letonja

Living people
Slovenian conductors (music)
Male conductors (music)
21st-century conductors (music)
21st-century male musicians
Musicians from Strasbourg
1961 births